Cuntz is a surname. Notable persons with that name include:

Eckart Cuntz (born 1950), German ambassador
Erich Cuntz (1916–1975), German field hockey player
Joachim Cuntz (born 1948), German mathematician
Manfred Cuntz (born 1958), German astrophysicist
Matthias Cuntz (born 1990), German soccer player
Michael Cuntz, German mathematician
Otto Cuntz (1865–1932), German-Austrian classical historian

See also
Kuntz (disambiguation)
Kuntze, a surname
Kunze, a surname

Surnames of German origin
Surnames from given names